Seetha Kalyanam is a 1976 Indian Telugu-language Hindu mythological film directed by Bapu from a screenplay written by Mullapudi Venkata Ramana. Based on the Bala Kanda, the ensemble cast film relates events from the birth of Lord Rama, the seventh incarnation of Vishnu, up to his wedding to Seetha, incarnation of Lakshmi.

The film won the Filmfare Award for Best Direction (Telugu). It was screened at the BFI London Film Festival, Chicago International Film Festival, San Reno and Denver International Film Festivals in 1978, and is part of the course work at the British Film Institute.

Plot

Granted several boons by the gods Brahma and Shiva, Ravana, the demon king of Lanka, uses his many powers to plague all creation, notably molesting women, many of whom he kidnaps. At the appeal of the gods and the sages, Vishnu assures them that he shall take an incarnation as a mortal, as the arrogant Rakshasa had never sought protection from men (or apes).

The goddess Lakshmi chooses to accompany her divine consort, first as the ascetic Vedaavati (who is insulted by Ravana), then as a baby who appears from a golden lotus in Ravana’s own palace in Lanka, and finally as the child who is discovered when Janaka, king of Videha, is performing the ritual of ploughing the ground before a sacrifice.

The film then describes the events that reunite the divine couple, stringing along the way various tales, in song and dance form, from the Rāmāyana that are tangentially related to the main narrative, including the creation of Lord Shiva’s bow, Vishnu’s avatar as Vamana, and the descent of the Ganga.

The movie ends with Parasurama, Visvamitra, and Vasishta being granted a vision of Rama, Seetha, Lakshmana, Bharata, and Shatrughna in their true, celestial, forms.

Cast
 Ravi Kumar as Lord Vishnu / Lord Rama
 Jaya Prada as Goddess Lakshmi / Goddess Seetha
 Gummadi as Dasharatha
 Kanta Rao as Narada
 Mikkilineni as Janaka
 Mukkamala as Vishwamitra
 Kaikala Satyanarayana as Ravana
 Dhulipala as Vashistha
 Tyagaraju as Parashurama
 Hemalata as Kausalya
 Jamuna as Kaikeyi
 P. R. Varalakshmi as Sumitra	
 Mamata as Mandodari
 P.J. Sarma as Sukracharya
 Bheemaraju as Bali Chakravarthi

Soundtrack 
The film has music composed by  K. V. Mahadevan with lyrics written by Thyagaraya Swamy, Bhakta Ramadasu, Arudra, and C. Narayana Reddy. Playback singers P. Susheela, S.P. Balasubrahmanyam, V. Ramakrishna, Vasantha, and P. B. Sreenivas gave vocals.

Release 
The film was released in Hindi with the title Sita Swayamvar and Malayalam as Seetha Swayamvaram.

Awards
Filmfare Awards South
 1976 - Filmfare Best Director Award (Telugu) – Bapu
 1976 - Filmfare Special Award for Excellent Performance - Gummadi

References

External links
 

1976 films
Films directed by Bapu
Films based on the Ramayana
Hindu mythological films
Films scored by K. V. Mahadevan
1970s Telugu-language films